Elections to Scottish Borders Council were held on 5 May 2022, the same day as the other  Scottish local elections.

The Scottish Greens won their first ever seat on the council.

Following the election, an administration was formed with the Conservatives and Independent Councillors Caroline Cochrane, Stuart Marshall, and Watson McAteer.

Conservative Councillors Euan Jardine from Galashiels & District, and Scott Hamilton from Jedburgh & District, were elected as Leader and Deputy Leader of the Council respectively. Independent Councillor Watson McAteer was elected as Convener.

Results

Ward results 
Source:

Tweeddale West
2017: 1xLib Dem; 1xCon; 1xSNP
2022: 1xLib Dem; 1xCon; 1xSNP
2017-2022 Change: No Change

Tweeddale East
2017: 1xCon; 1xSNP; 1xInd
2022: 1xSNP; 1xCon; 1xInd
2017-2022 Change: No Change

Galashiels and District
2017: 1xSNP; 1xCon; 2xIndependent 
2022: 1xSNP; 1xCon; 1xLib Dem, 1XGrn
2017-2022 Change: Lib Dem and Green gain one seat each from Independents.

Selkirkshire
2017: 1xCon; 1xSNP; 1xIndependent 
2022: 1xIndependent; 1xCon; 1xSNP; 
2017-2022 Change: Independent (Cochrane) gains from Independent (Edgar).

Leaderdale and Melrose
2017: 1xIndependent; 1xCon; 1xSNP 
2022: 1xIndependent; 1xCon; 1xSNP 
2017-2022 Change: No Change

Mid Berwickshire
2017: 2xCon; 1xSNP 
2022: 2xCon; 1xSNP 
2017-2022 Change: No change

East Berwickshire
2017: 2 x Conservative; 1 x SNP
2022: 1 x Conservative; 1x SNP; 1 x Independent
2017-2022 Change: 1 x Independent gain from Conservative

Kelso and District
2017: 2 x Conservative, 1 x Liberal Democrat
2022: 2 x Conservative, 1 x Liberal Democrat
2017-2022 Change: No Change

Jedburgh and District
2017: 2 x Conservative, 1 x SNP
2022: 2 x Conservative, 1 x SNP
2017-2022 Change: No change

Hawick and Denholm
2017: 1 x Independent; 1 x Conservative, 1 x SNP
2022: 2 x Independent; 1 x Conservative
2017-2022 Change: 1 x Independent gain from SNP 
 

Clair Ramage was elected as an SNP Councillor in the 2017 election for Hawick & Denholm

Hawick and Hermitage
2017: 2 x Independent; 1 x Conservative
2022: 1 x Independent; 1 x Conservative; 1 x SNP
2017-2022 Change: 1 x SNP gain from Independent

References 

Scottish Borders Council elections
Scottish Borders